"Il bene nel male" is a song by Italian singer Madame. It was written by Madame with Bias and Brail, and produced by the latter two with Luca Faraone and Shablo.

It was released by Sugar Music and Universal Music Italia on 9 February 2023 as the first single from Madame's upcoming second album L'amore. The song was the artist's entry for the Sanremo Music Festival 2023, the 73rd edition of Italy's musical festival which doubles also as a selection of the act for the Eurovision Song Contest.

Music video
The music video for the song was released on YouTube on the same day of the single's release. It was directed by Martina Pastori and filmed in a villa in Brianza, Lombardy. The video also includes the participation of Italian actress Giorgia Ferrero.

Personnel
Credits adapted from Tidal.
 Madame – associated performer, composer, lyricist, vocals
 Nicolas Biasin "Bias" – composer, producer
 Iacopo Sinigaglia "Brail" – composer, producer
 Luca Faraone – producer
 Shablo – producer

Charts

References

2023 singles
2023 songs
Madame (singer) songs
Sanremo Music Festival songs